Renchinlkhümbe is a sum of Khövsgöl Province in Mongolia. In 2000, the sum had 4284 inhabitants, mainly Darkhad.

History 

The Renchinlkhümbe sum was founded, together with the whole Khövsgöl aimag, in 1931. In 1933, it had about 1,800 inhabitants in 544 households, and about 32,000 heads of livestock. The local Altan Tal (Golden Steppe) negdel was founded in 1956. The Zöölöngiin Khüree monastery (est. in 1750) had been located near what is now the sum center since 1771. Renchinlkhümbe was named after Jambyn Lkhümbe a member of the Presidium (or Politburo) of the Central Committee of the Mongolian People's Revolutionary Party (MPRP) from 1930 to 1933

Climate
Renchinlkhümbe has a subarctic climate (Köppen climate classification Dwc) with cool summers and bitterly cold winters. Most precipitation falls in the summer as rain, with some snow in the adjacent months of May and September. Winters are very dry. With an average temperature of  Renchinlkhümbe lies in the continuous permafrost zone.

Economy 

In 2004, there were roughly 95,000 heads of livestock, among them 34,000 sheep, 30,000 goats, 21,000 cattle and yaks, 9,200 horses, and 170 camels.

Miscellaneous 

The area forms part of the Darkhad valley (Darkhadyn Khotgor) and is considered remote and relatively inaccessible even for Mongolian standards. The local Darkhad are known for their practice of Shamanism. Erdeniin Bat-Üül worked as teacher in Renchinlkhümbe for several years.

Literature 

M.Nyamaa, Khövsgöl aimgiin lavlakh toli, Ulaanbaatar 2001, p. 121f

References 

Districts of Khövsgöl Province